"One Way Love" is a 1965 song written by Bert Berns and Jerry Ragovoy under their pseudonyms Bert Russell and Norman Meade. It was first a single for The Drifters, who reached Number 55 on the Billboard Hot 100 with their version.

Background
Cash Box described the Drifters' version as "a pulsating, thump-a-beat cha cha opus...that the boys knock out in their very commercial manner."

Cover versions
The song became a UK Top 10 hit for Cliff Bennett and the Rebel Rousers in 1964, reaching Number 9.
The song was covered by The Gamblers in 1965.
The song was covered by Dexys Midnight Runners in 1980 and appeared in their single "Keep It Part Two (Inferiority Part One)".

References

1965 songs
Songs written by Bert Berns
Songs written by Jerry Ragovoy
The Drifters songs